The East Offering its Riches to Britannia is an oil painting created by Spyridon Romas.  Romas was a Greek painter from the island of Corfu active from 1745 to 1786 in Corfu, Lecce, Livorno, and London.  He was a painter of the Heptanese School and later adopted the English style of painting. The painter migrated to London in 1770 and remained in the region for the rest of his life.  Roughly twenty-five of his works survived.  Romas painted several portraits in London but also maintained art.  The painter's most well-known work is The East Offering its Riches to Britannia.

Colonialism was very popular starting around 1500 until the end of World War II.  By 1800, Europeans controlled roughly 35% of the world, and by 1914, they controlled 84% of the world. The British Empire at its height was the largest empire in history.  Its domination began around 1500 and by 1913, the British Empire had dominion of over 23 percent of the world population or about 412 million people. The painting commissioned by the East India Company was a tribute to the British Empire.  The East India Company offers its riches to Britannia. The painting symbolizes the British Empire's imperial colonial domination over the world.
 
Paintings depicting colonization were a popular theme among painters during the period of colonization.  Italian painter originally from Venice Giovanni Battista Tiepolo completed many such works, one important example depicting Spanish Colonialism was Wealth and Benefits of the Spanish Monarchy under Charles III.  Dutch Colonialism was depicted in two works, one created by Dutch painter Pieter Isaacsz entitled the Harpsichord Lid showing an Allegory of Amsterdam as the Center of World Trade and another painted by Dutch painter Willem de Poorter entitled Allegory of Colonial Power. The East Offering its Riches to Britannia falls under the period of English neoclassicism.  The painting was in the Revenue Committee Room of the East India House in London.  The building was demolished and its contents were moved to the British Library where the work of art can be found today.

Description
The massive work of art is ten feet long with a height of 228 cm (89.7 in) and a width of 305 cm (10 ft).  The work was completed in 1778.  The painting symbolizes Britons dominance over the world.  India, Persia, China, and the Americas are represented.  The East India Company is offering its riches to the female warrior Britannia.  She is accompanied by four putto one holds her floating dress and shield while the one directly below him holds her sacred trident.  The lion symbolized the might of Britannia as she sits on her majestic throne elevated higher than her loyal subjects.  Old Father Thames the personification of the river Thames in London pours water at Britannia's feet.  A beautiful bare breasted dark complexioned kneeling woman representing India offers pearls and jewels to Britannia.  Britannia is depicted as an alluring gorgeous bare-breasted pale white woman accepting her extravagant gifts from India holding pearls in her two hands.  Between the two figures, a ship with the flag of the East India Company floats in the distant background.  

China is represented by a kneeling woman dressed in gold and blue holding a Chinese vase situated next to a box with symbols.  Behind the woman directly below the god Mercury, the Americas are represented by two figures offering cotton.  A Persian man appears under the right arm of Mercury carrying silk.  Behind the Persian man, an elephant and camel appear. The god Mercury is associated with financial gain and commerce.  He points his staff with intertwined snakes at Britannia transferring power to the mighty female warrior while he gazed angrily upon the Americas.  Surprisingly around this period, the American Revolutionary War was taking place. The war was in its third year.  The painting relays an illusion of dramatic subjugation containing rococo and neoclassical elements.                         

The artist clearly conveys his complete understanding of human anatomy.  The Heptanese School began to evolve into a more sophisticated representation of the human subject.  Romas clearly matured as an artist spending many years in Italy traveling all over the country and finally settling in London.  The artist conveys his understanding of the human nude subject.  The playful juxtaposition of bare-breasted pale and dark women relays a message of cultural identity.  Romas painted attractive sculpturesque figures and brilliantly employed a complex shadowing technique.  The blue sky relays impressionistic characteristics.

Gallery

References

Bibliography 

 

Paintings in London
British Library collections
1778 paintings
Heptanese School (painting)